In differential geometry, a quaternion-Kähler symmetric space or Wolf space is a quaternion-Kähler manifold which, as a Riemannian manifold, is a Riemannian symmetric space. Any quaternion-Kähler symmetric space with positive Ricci curvature is compact and simply connected, and is a Riemannian product of quaternion-Kähler symmetric spaces associated to compact simple Lie groups.

For any compact simple Lie group G, there is a unique  G/H obtained as a quotient of G by a subgroup

Here, Sp(1) is the compact form of the SL(2)-triple associated with the highest root of G, and K its centralizer in G. These are classified as follows.

The twistor spaces of quaternion-Kähler symmetric spaces are the homogeneous holomorphic contact manifolds, classified by Boothby: they are the adjoint varieties of the complex semisimple Lie groups.

These spaces can be obtained by taking a projectivization of
a minimal nilpotent orbit of the respective complex Lie group.
The holomorphic contact structure is apparent, because
the nilpotent orbits of semisimple Lie groups 
are equipped with the Kirillov-Kostant holomorphic symplectic form. This argument also explains how one
can associate a unique Wolf space to each of the simple
complex Lie groups.

See also

Quaternionic discrete series representation

References
. Reprint of the 1987 edition.
.

Differential geometry
Structures on manifolds
Riemannian geometry
Homogeneous spaces
Lie groups